Xue Xiangdong (born 1958/1959) is a Chinese billionaire businessman, chairman of DHC Software, a Chinese industrial application software company.

He graduated from Hunan University in 1978.

He left a state-owned company in 1992 to work as the China representative of a Canadian software company, and borrowed money to start his own software firm in 1993. In 2001, he co-founded what was to become DHC Software.

As of March 2022, Forbes estimated his net worth at US$1.9 billion.

He is married and lives in Beijing.

References

1958 births
Living people
Hunan University alumni
Chinese billionaires
Chinese technology company founders
20th-century Chinese businesspeople
21st-century Chinese businesspeople
Businesspeople in software